The TD postcode area, also known as the Galashiels postcode area, is a group of fifteen postcode districts in south-east Scotland and the far north-east of England, within seventeen post towns. These cover most of the Scottish Borders council area (including Galashiels, Lauder, Gordon, Earlston, Kelso, Melrose, Selkirk, Jedburgh, Hawick, Newcastleton, Duns, Coldstream, Cockburnspath and Eyemouth) and the northernmost part of Northumberland (including Berwick-upon-Tweed, Cornhill-on-Tweed and Mindrum), plus a part of south-eastern East Lothian and a very small part of Cumbria.

The letters in the postcode are derived from Tweeddale. The TD postcode area is the smallest by population.



Coverage
The approximate coverage of the postcode districts:

|-
! TD1
| GALASHIELS
| Galashiels, Tweedbank, Boleside, Clovenfords, Caddonfoot, Fountainhall, Stow, Blainslie, Lindean
| Scottish Borders
|-
! TD2
| LAUDER
| Lauder, Oxton
| Scottish Borders
|-
! TD3
| GORDON
| Gordon, Houndslow, Westruther
| Scottish Borders
|-
! TD4
| EARLSTON
| Earlston, Legerwood, Redpath
| Scottish Borders
|-
! TD5
| KELSO
| Kelso, Ednam, Stichill, Eccles, Hume, Nenthorn, Smailholm, Roxburgh, Eckford, Heiton, Morebattle, Hownam, Linton, Town Yetholm, Kirk Yetholm, Lempitlaw, Sprouston, Makerstoun
| Scottish Borders
|-
! TD6
| MELROSE
| Melrose, Darnick, Gattonside, Newstead, Eildon, Newtown St Boswells, St Boswells, Bowden, Lilliesleaf, Maxton, Clintmains, Dryburgh, Bemersyde
| Scottish Borders
|-
! TD7
| SELKIRK
| Selkirk, Lindean, Midlem, Ashkirk, Philiphaugh, Broadmeadows, Yarrowford, Yarrow, Ettrick, St Mary's Loch, Ettrickbridge
| Scottish Borders
|-
! TD8
| JEDBURGH
| Jedburgh, Ancrum, Camptown, Crailing, Jed Valley, Nisbet, Oxnam, Lanton
| Scottish Borders
|-
! rowspan="2"|TD9
| HAWICK
| Hawick, Bedrule, Bonchester Bridge, Chesters, Denholm, Newmill-on-Teviot, Roberton, Wilton Dean, Craik, Minto
| Scottish Borders
|-
| NEWCASTLETON
| Newcastleton, Kershopefoot
| Scottish Borders, Carlisle
|-
! TD10
| DUNS
| Greenlaw, Polwarth
| Scottish Borders
|-
! TD11
| DUNS
| Duns, Chirnside, Allanton, Cranshaws, Longformacus, Fogo, Gavinton, Swinton, Whitsome, Edrom, Preston, Abbey St Bathans, Grantshouse, Chirnsidebridge
| Scottish Borders, East Lothian
|-
! rowspan="3"|TD12
| COLDSTREAM
| Coldstream, Leitholm, Birgham, Lennel
| Scottish Borders
|-
| CORNHILL-ON-TWEED
| Cornhill-on-Tweed, Branxton, Crookham, Etal, Carham, Wark on Tweed, 
| rowspan="2"|Northumberland
|-
| MINDRUM
| Mindrum, Kilham
|-
! TD13
| COCKBURNSPATH
| Cockburnspath, Oldhamstocks, Dunglass, Cove
| Scottish Borders, East Lothian
|-
! TD14
| EYEMOUTH
| Eyemouth, Coldingham, St Abbs, Ayton, Burnmouth, Reston, Auchencrow, Houndwood
| Scottish Borders
|-
! TD15
| BERWICK-UPON-TWEED
| Foulden, Mordington, Lamberton, Paxton, Fishwick, Ladykirk, Norham, Ford, Cheswick, Holy Island, Hutton, Horncliffe, Duddo, Fenwick, Ancroft, Lowick, Scremerston, Spittal, Holburn
| Northumberland, Scottish Borders
|}

Map

See also
Postcode Address File
List of postcode areas in the United Kingdom

References

External links
Royal Mail's Postcode Address File
A quick introduction to Royal Mail's Postcode Address File (PAF)

Postcode areas covering Scotland
Postcode areas covering North East England